Julia Fortmeyer was a 19th-century abortionst from St. Louis, Missouri, who was convicted of manslaughter in 1875 and sentenced to five years in prison. A contemporary article reported that "without a shadow of a blush or a remnant of feeling, [she] calmly stated that she had burned the bodies of more than a hundred babies." 

L.U. Reavis later recounted that prosecutor Colonel Normile had unsuccessfully sought to prove that Fortmeyer had burned a baby alive. The trial was published by Barclay & Company of Philadelphia. During the trial Normile accused Fortmeyer of trying to "drag chaste matrons and timid maids" into the "scandal". He argued for both murder in the first degree or manslaughter in the second.

In 1899 a St Louis newspaper compared Fortmeyer to another abortionist who had been arrested under similar circumstances, Henrietta Bamberger, reporting that Fortmeyer had "killed infants and burned their bodies in a cook stove."

References

American abortion providers
Criminals from Missouri
People from St. Louis
Manslaughter trials
19th-century American women